Baltmannsweiler is a municipality in the district of Esslingen in Baden-Württemberg. It belongs to the Region Stuttgart. (until 1992 Region Mittlerer Neckar) and the European Metropolitan Region Stuttgart.

Geography

Geographical location 

The densely wooded municipal area Baltmannsweiler lies at about 290 to 465 meters in virgin forest. The center of the name-giving suburb is about four and a half kilometers northeast of Plochingen as the crow flies and about ten kilometers east of the center of the district town Esslingen am Neckar. The two villages of the community are situated in a common clearing island on a mountain ridge, which is drained by the Reichenbach at the edge of the community and by the Lützelbach at its south-western edge to the Fils as well as in the west and north-west from the upper reaches of the Schweizerbach to the Rems.

Neighbouring communities 
Adjoining communities are in turn the town Weinstadt in the northwest, the community Winterbach in the north and northeast, both in the Rems-Murr-Kreis. In the east is the community Lichtenwald, in the south the community Reichenbach an der Fils, in the southwest the town Plochingen, in the west on only a short section the county town Esslingen am Neckar and in the west the community Aichwald; the last five belong all to the own District Esslingen.

Area usage

Religion 
At the end of 1998, the municipality had 1275 inhabitants who were Roman Catholic and 2998 inhabitants who were Protestant.

History

Baltmannsweiler 
Baltmannsweiler was first documented in 1299. The village originally belonged to the Zähringern and then came to Württemberg. There it was assigned to the Amt, later Oberamt Schorndorf from 1381 on. Since 1938 Baltmannsweiler belongs to the district of Esslingen. The autochthonen Inhabitants of the village today used name for the village is "Baltemore".

Development of population 

¹Statistical Office of the State of Baden-Württemberg; until 1970 census results, from 1975 onwards updates on 31 December of each year.

Economy and Infrastructure

Resident companies 

The Hohengehren district is home to Schneider Verlag, a specialist book publisher.

Education 
 Baltmannsweiler primary school with eight classes, in which about 160 pupils are taught
 Primary school Hohengehren with seven classes, in which about 130 children are taught
Baltmannsweiler also has four kindergartens.
 The municipality of Baltmannsweiler also runs its own adult education centre.

Waste disposal 

The waste management company of the district of Esslingen is responsible for waste disposal.

Culture and sights 

Every year, the municipality of Baltmannsweiler organises five to eight cultural events such as cabaret and theatre, concerts and mobile cinema in the cultural centre Baltmannsweiler. The cultural centre has a foyer with a bar, where there is room for celebrations with up to 120 people. In addition there is a large hall for 300 to 500 people.

The hunting lodge Hohengehren stood in the former game park until 1839. This was acquired by the municipality Altbach, rebuilt there as town hall and used in this function until 1975.

External links 

 Offizielle Homepage von Baltmannsweiler

References 

Esslingen (district)